is a hospital in the Kōhoku ward of Yokohama, Kanagawa, Japan.  It is adjacent to Nissan Stadium and is accessible on foot from Shin-Yokohama Station.

As one of the hospitals owned and operated by the Japan Organization of Occupational Health and Safety (JOHAS), an independent administrative institution, it is classified as a workplace accident and illness hospital (rōsai byōin). The hospital also functions as a general hospital for members of the public and includes a 24-hour emergency and critical care center.

Opened in June 1991, the hospital serves as a teaching hospital affiliated with Yokohama City University, University of Tokyo, and Chiba University. It is designated by the City of Yokohama as one of the city's disaster base hospitals during times of natural disaster.

Facilities and operations
Yokohama Rosai Hospital has 650 beds, with space for up to 880 beds in the future. The facility comprises three principal buildings: the inpatients' ward, the central clinic, and the outpatients' ward.  These three buildings are joined by a series of corridors forming a central indoor plaza.

Departments include Hematology, Nephrology, Oncology, Rheumatology, Psychiatry, Psychosomatic Medicine, Neurology, Respiratory Medicine, Gastroenterology, Cardiovascular Medicine, Pediatrics, Neonatology, Orthopedic Surgery, Plastic Surgery, Neurosurgery, Respiratory Surgery, Cardiovascular Surgery, Dermatology, Urology, Obstetrics and Gynecology, Ophthalmology, Otolaryngology, Rehabilitation Medicine, Radiotherapy, Radiology, Anesthesiology, Clinical Laboratory, Pathology, Dentistry, Dentistry and Oral Surgery, and Emergency.

Some English speaking services are available.

Notes

References

External links

Hospital buildings completed in 1991
Hospitals in Yokohama
Hospitals established in 1991
1991 establishments in Japan
Buildings and structures in Yokohama
Teaching hospitals in Japan